Moscow-Riga Railroad Bridge is a concrete arch bridge that spans the Moscow Canal between Tushino and Shchukino Districts in northwestern Moscow, Russia. The bridge does not have an official name and is sometimes called the Railroad bridge over Moscow Canal. It was completed in 1936, designed by A.S.Bachelis.

History and specifications
Construction of Moscow Canal (1932-1938) required building a new railroad bridge on a track running over the lower chamber of Lock No.8., near the village of Shchukino, which at this time was far outside the city limits. Tram service to Shchukino was started soon afterwards in 1938, but urban development didn't began until the 1960s.

Inside, the arch box has diaphragm braces ( thick on  spacing, with corresponding vertical beams on the outer walls. Each arch stands on concrete foundations , supported by 992 wooden piles.

This bold bridge has become an icon of pre-World War II soviet propaganda, including on a postage stamp (January 1941) and in movie appearances. According to the most recent studies (1990), the bridge is structurally safe and sound, although its unpainted concrete may look rusty upon close inspection.

Gallery

See also
 List of bridges in Moscow

References

Bridges in Moscow
Railway bridges in Russia
Deck arch bridges
Bridges completed in 1936
Bridges built in the Soviet Union
Concrete bridges
Rail transport in the Soviet Union